Campanula uniflora, known commonly as arctic bellflower and arctic harebell,  is a short and slender rhizomatous perennial in the bellflower family Campanulaceae. It is distributed in arctic North America, including the Rocky Mountains and Greenland, in the Asian part of Beringia and in Iceland, Svalbard, the Scandes Mountains and Novaja Zemlja.

The species was first discovered by Linnaeus on his 1732 expedition to Lapland and described in his Flora Lapponica (1737).

In Iceland, Campanula uniflora is a host of the common pathogenic fungus Pleospora herbarum.

References

External links

USDA Plants profile for Campanula uniflora

uniflora
Flora of Alaska
Flora of Canada
Flora of Finland
Flora of Greenland
Flora of Iceland
Flora of Norway
Flora of Russia
Flora of Svalbard
Flora of Sweden
Flora of the Western United States
Flora of the Rocky Mountains
Plants described in 1753
Taxa named by Carl Linnaeus